The 2022 King George VI and Queen Elizabeth Stakes was a horse race run at Ascot Racecourse on Saturday 23 July 2022. It was the 72nd running of the King George VI and Queen Elizabeth Stakes.

The contenders
The race attracted a field of six runners, four from England and one each from Germany and Ireland.

The favourite was Westover, a three-year-old colt who finished third in the 2022 Epsom Derby, making up ground late in the race after an obstructed progress, and who went on to win the Irish Derby by seven lengths. Second favourite was the three-year-old filly Emily Upjohn, who was just beaten in the Epsom Oaks after stumbling at the start of the race and who was prevented from running in the Irish Oaks when the plane she was due to fly to Ireland in was grounded. The most-favoured contender of the older horses in the race was Mishriff, winner of the Prix du Jockey Club in 2020, the International Stakes in 2021 and who had finished second in the Eclipse Stakes on his most recent run. Germany was represented by Torquator Tasso, winner of three Group One races including the 2022 Prix de l'Arc de Triomphe, while Aidan O'Brien's Ballydoyle stable was responsible for Ireland's entry, Broome, the winner of the 2021 Grand Prix de Saint-Cloud and who had won the Hardwicke Stakes at Royal Ascot on his most recent appearance. The six-runner field was completed by Pyledriver, the 2021 Coronation Cup winner.

Race details
 Sponsor: QIPCO
 Purse: £1,250,000; First prize: £708,875
 Surface: Turf
 Going: Good to Firm
 Distance: 12 furlongs
 Number of runners: 6
 Winner's time:2:29.49

Full result

Winner's details
Further details of the winner, 
 Sex: Horse
 Foaled: 14 March 2017
 Country: United Kingdom
 Sire: Harbour Watch
 Owner: La Pyle Partnership
 Breeder: Knox & Wells Limited & R. Devlin

See also
2022 British Champions Series

References

King George
 2022
King George VI and Queen Elizabeth Stakes
2020s in Berkshire
King George VI